Vitolo may refer to:

Víctor José Añino Bermúdez (born 1983), Spanish footballer
Víctor Machín Pérez (born 1989), Spanish footballer who has represented his country's national team
Vitolo Kulihaapai, King of Uvea from 1918 to 1924

People with the surname
Dennis Vitolo (born 1956), American racing driver
Tommy Vitolo (born 1978), American politician